Mohamed Saeed al-Shehii (born March 28, 1988) is a professional Emirati footballer. He currently plays as a winger. He is nicknamed The الوضيحي

Honours

Individual

 UAE League: Rookie Of the Year 2006 - 2007.
 UAE League:Best Emirati Player 2007 - 2008.

External links
 
 Mohammed al-Shehii Official Website  (Arabic)
 

1988 births
Living people
Al Wahda FC players
Al Dhafra FC players
Sharjah FC players
Al-Ittihad Kalba SC players
Emirati footballers
2011 AFC Asian Cup players
Asian Games medalists in football
Footballers at the 2010 Asian Games
Asian Games silver medalists for the United Arab Emirates
UAE Pro League players
Association football wingers
Medalists at the 2010 Asian Games
United Arab Emirates international footballers
2007 AFC Asian Cup players